Steven Carroll (born 1949) is an Australian novelist.  He was born in Melbourne, Victoria and studied at La Trobe University. He has taught English at secondary school level, and drama at RMIT. He has been Drama Critic for The Sunday Age newspaper in Melbourne.

Steven Carroll is now a full-time writer living in Melbourne with his partner, the writer Fiona Capp, and their son. As of 2019, he also writes the non-fiction book review column for the Sydney Morning Herald.

Awards and nominations

 2002: Miles Franklin Award, Shortlisted, The Art of the Engine Driver
 2005: Miles Franklin Award, Shortlisted, The Gift of Speed
 2005: Prix Femina (France), Shortlisted for Best Foreign Novel, The Art of the Engine Driver
 2008: Miles Franklin Award, Winner, The Time We Have Taken
 2008: Commonwealth Writers' Prize for the SE Asia and Pacific Region, Winner, The Time We Have Taken
 2013: Prime Minister's Literary Award, Joint Winner for Fiction, A World of Other People
 2015: Victorian Premier's Literary Award, Shortlisted, Forever Young
 2016: Prime Minister's Literary Award, Shortlisted for Fiction, Forever Young
 2018: Victorian Premier's Literary Award, Shortlisted, A New England Affair

Bibliography

Novels
 Remember Me, Jimmy James (1992)
 Momoko (1994)
 The Love Song of Lucy McBride (1998)
 The Lovers' Room (2007) [revised version of Momoko]
 Twilight in Venice (2008) [this is a substantially re-written and abridged version of The Love Song of Lucy McBride], also published as The Last Venetian
 O (2021)

Glenroy series
 The Art of the Engine Driver (2001)
 The Gift of Speed (2004)
 The Time We Have Taken (2007)
 Spirit of Progress (2011)
 Forever Young (2015)
 The Year of the Beast (2019)

The Eliot quartet
 The Lost Life: A Novel (2009)
 A World of Other People (2013)
 A New England Affair (2017)
 Goodnight, Vivienne, Goodnight (2022)

Critical studies and reviews
 
 Review of Spirit of Progress.
 Review of A world of other people.

Interviews
 Interview with Deborah Bogle in "The Advertiser", 10 March 2007 
 Transcript of interview from the radio program "The Book Show", 20 June 2008 
 Podcast of interview with Louise Swinn, 20 July 2008 

 Gillian Dooley, "Reinventing Lives: A Conversation with Steven Carroll" in "Writers in Conversation", February 2019

References

External links
 

1949 births
Living people
Miles Franklin Award winners
Writers from Melbourne
20th-century Australian novelists
20th-century Australian male writers
21st-century Australian novelists
Australian male novelists
21st-century Australian male writers